Kidd Mine or Kidd Creek Mine is an underground base metal mine  north of Timmins, Ontario, Canada. It is owned and operated by Swiss multinational Glencore Inc. The mine was discovered in 1963 by Texas Gulf Sulfur Company. In 1981 it was sold to Canada Development Corporation, then sold in 1986 to Falconbridge Ltd., which in 2006 was acquired by Xstrata, which in turn merged with Glencore in 2013. Following the closure of the majority of the Met Site, concentrate is now shipped to Quebec for processing. Kidd Mine is the world's deepest copper-zinc mine.

History
An aerial geophysical survey, conducted by Texas Gulf Sulphur Company in March 1959, indicated an anomaly in the Kidd-55 segment warranting ground investigation.  A ground electromagnetic survey was conducted in Oct 1963 and a drill rig started drilling a 600-foot core sample in Nov.  The core, later confirmed by the Union Assay Office in Salt Lake City, showed an average copper content of 1.15%, an average zinc content of 8.64%, and 3.94 ounces of silver per ton.  A second hole was drilled in March 1964, followed by two more in early April.  The copper-zinc-silver ore deposit at Kidd Mine discovery was announced in a press release after the board of directors meeting on 16 April 1964.  Seven drill holes indicated an ore body 800 feet long, 300 feet wide, and a vertical depth of 800 feet.

During the initial exploration of the site, then known as Kidd-55, officers of the company engaged in insider trading in Texas Gulf shares.  The ensuing lawsuit by the Securities and Exchange Commission resulted in a landmark decision that established the right of all market participants to have "relatively equal access to material information."

The mine began ore production in 1966, as an open pit mine and eventually evolved into an underground mine. The mine produces copper, zinc, and several other metals.

The mine has the oldest-known flowing water on Earth. A billion year old water sample collected from the mine was added to the collection at Ingenium in Ottawa on November 25, 2020.

Geology

The Kidd deposit is one of the largest volcanogenic massive sulfide ore deposits in the world, and one of the world's largest base metal deposits. It lies within the Abitibi greenstone belt.

Current operation
Kidd Mine and Met Site collectively employ approximately 850 employees and contractors. The investment would add 3.4 million tonnes of ore into the mine plan. The expansion included the development of three additional production levels and deepening the ramp from the 9100 level to the 9600 level, where the loading pocket is located. This included an extension of the ventilation and backfill systems to the new sections of the mine. The mine's expected production life has since been extended to 2021. In 2019 exploration drills were set up on the 9,800 level to search out and define the new ore zone.

Depth
Kidd is the deepest base metal mine in the world.

See also
List of mines in Ontario
Volcanology of Canada
Volcanology of Eastern Canada
Coleman Mine

References

Source
Hannington, M. D., and Barrie, C. T., editors, 1999, The Giant Kidd Creek Volcanogenic Massive Sulfide Deposit, Western Abitibi Subprovince, Canada: Economic Geology Monograph 10, The Giant Kidd Creek Volcanogenic Massive Sulfide Deposit, Western Abitibi Subprovince, Canada. 672 p.
John Brooks, "Annals of Finance: A Reasonable Amount of Time," The New Yorker, Nov. 9, 1968, p. 160.
Reprinted in John Brooks, Business Adventures. New York: Weybright & Talley, 1969. Ch. 4, pp. 118-144.

External links

Copper mines in Ontario
Mines in Timmins
Volcanogenic massive sulfide ore deposits
Xstrata
Zinc mines in Canada
Silver mines in Canada